Netzarim was  an Israeli settlement in the Gaza Strip about 5 kilometers southwest of Gaza City. It was established in 1972. In August 2005, the inhabitants of Netzarim were evicted by the Israel Defense Forces as part of Israel's unilateral disengagement plan.

History
It began as a secular Nahal (Young Pioneer) outpost of the Hashomer Hatzair movement; in 1984 it became an orthodox kibbutz. A few years later, the residents decided to change from a kibbutz to a village. It was often referred to in the media as a stronghold for Religious Zionism. Its activities included a mango plantation and vineyard, hothouse cultivated yams and cherry tomatoes, and a prestigious etrog plantation. The settlement also boasted day care centers, kindergartens, a primary school, a kollel, a Yeshiva, and the Jews of Gaza Heritage Institute, which documented Jewish settlement in Gaza over the generations. The development of educational institutions independent from the Gush Katif bloc was due to its isolated location and intensifying Palestinian attacks on traffic using the only route in during the al-Aqsa Intifada. During the last several years of its existence, transportation to and from Netzarim was permitted only with armed military escorts.

Eviction
The residents of Netzarim were the last Israelis to be evicted on August 22, 2005 by the Israel Defense Forces during Israel's unilateral disengagement plan from the Gaza Strip ordered by the government of Ariel Sharon. Their eviction marked the end of the Israeli presence in the Gaza Strip since the end of the 1967 Six-Day War. The strong religiosity of its residents was exhibited by seedlings being planted in the greenhouses, cement being laid for a new home that very morning, and a large prayer session in the main synagogue that would later be destroyed by Palestinians after the Israeli army finally abandoned the village on September 12, 2005. 

After the eviction, the residents, who had prided themselves in not cooperating with any government agency involved in the eviction, were welcomed in the dormitories of the College of Judea and Samaria by the school administration, students, volunteers and residents of Ariel and the surrounding West Bank settlements. Before the beginning of the academic year, the former residents of Netzarim decided to split up into two groups. One group moved to the temporary government refugee camp of Yevul near the Egyptian border. The other group decided to stay in Ariel.

Operation Cast Lead
The IDF took possession of Netzarim again during Operation Cast Lead and entered with 150 Merkava and other military vehicles on January 4, 2009. The reoccupation of Netzarim effectively separated Gaza City from southern Gaza Strip, weakening Hamas' control of the region. On the early morning of January 12, troops stationed at Netzarim began their northward push into Gaza City's Sheikh Ijlin neighborhood. When a ceasefire was declared by Israel on January 17, the IDF gradually evacuated the site.

References

Populated places established in 1972
Former Israeli settlements in the Gaza Strip
Religious Israeli settlements
Nahal settlements
Gaza War (2008–2009)
Villages depopulated during the Arab–Israeli conflict